Jānis Klaužs (born 6 May 1953) is a Latvian politician. He is a Deputy of the Saeima and a member of the People's Party.

References

1953 births
Living people
People from Līvāni Municipality
People's Party (Latvia) politicians
Deputies of the 9th Saeima
Deputies of the 10th Saeima
Deputies of the 11th Saeima
Deputies of the 12th Saeima